Việt Bắc (Northern Vietnam) is a region of Vietnam north of Hanoi that served as the Việt Minh's base of support during the First Indochina War (1946–1954). 

Việt Bắc is also called the capital of northernmost Vietnam because this area was the location of the headquarters of the Communist Party of Vietnam at the period before the rising against French domination in 1945, and the location of the headquarters of the Việt Minh government during the war of resistance against the French colonialists.

Administrative divisions 

The Việt Bắc Interzone (Liên khu Việt Bắc) was an administrative region consisting of 17 provinces: Cao Bằng, Bắc Kạn, Lạng Sơn, Thái Nguyên, Hà Giang, Tuyên Quang, Lào Cai, Yên Bái, Sơn La, Lai Châu, Bắc Giang, Bắc Ninh, Phúc Yên, Vĩnh Yên, Phú Thọ, Quảng Yên, Hải Ninh, Hồng Gai Special Zone, and Mai Đà District of Hòa Bình. The center of the region was Tuyên Quang.

The administrative of Việt Bắc is called by Administrative Committee of Interregional. It includes Viet bac Interregional is a level of administrative and Military (High command). It was established under the Decree No 127SL of President of the Democratic Republic of Vietnam (The former name of Socialist Republic of Vietnam) on November 4, 1949, beyond the merger of Interregions No. 1 and No. 10.

History 

From 1949 to 1954, Senior Lieutenant-general Chu Văn Tấn is the chief of Interregional, secretary zone party committee, Tribunal president of Military court, president of administrative committee of Viet Bac. From 1954 to the end of 1956, he was in charged Commander, Political Commissar holding currently and Secretary of Interregional of Viet Bac.
When the Tây Bắc (North West Area) just have liberated.  Tay Bac Zone was established beyond the Decree No 13-SL of Prime Ministor on  January 28, 1953, including 4 provinces : Lai Châu, Lào Cai, Yên Bái and Sơn La just have detach from Viet Bac Interregional
On July 1, 1956, Self-governing Viet Bac was established have put an end to Viet Bac Interregional with the role of administrative Unit. However, about Military aspect, in June 1957, Viet Bac Interregional was replaced by Viet Bac Military Zone.
Initially, Self-governing Viet Bac includes 5 provinces: Cao Bằng, Bắc Cạn, Lạng Sơn, Tuyên Quang, Thái Nguyên and adding Hà Giang Province later. Viet Bac and Tay Bac Self-governing together is the region with many Ethnic minority living and have the special policy for development in these area.

Geography of Vietnam
First Indochina War
Regions of Vietnam